Poa bigelovii is a species of grass known by the common name Bigelow's bluegrass. It is native to the southwestern United States and northwestern Mexico, where it grows in shady spots in desert and plateau habitat.

It is an annual bunchgrass growing in small clumps up to 40 centimeters tall. The inflorescence is a narrow, compact, cylindrical series of hairy spikelets. The spikelets sometimes have a curly tuft of hairs or cobwebby fibers near their bases.

External links
Jepson Manual Treatment
USDA Plants Profile
Grass Manual Treatment

bigelovii
Bunchgrasses of North America
Grasses of the United States
Native grasses of California
Grasses of Mexico
Flora of the California desert regions
Flora of the Southwestern United States
Flora of Northwestern Mexico